The Sasoma–Sasser La-Saser Brangsa-Gapsam-Daulat Beg Oldi Road (SSSG-DBO Road), also Sasoma-Sasser La Road or the Sasoma–Saser Pass Road, is an under-construction road in Ladakh in India between Nubra Valley and Daulat Beg Oldi (DBO) in Depsang Plains. This also includes construction of a tunnel between Saser La  to Saser Brangsa, wildlife approval for which was already granted in April 2022. As of January 2023, Sasoma (near Siachen Base Camp) in south to Saser La in north route is under-construction - which is reachable on Saser La side from Murgo in northeast by a motorable road, Saser La to Saser Brangsa in northwest is a 30 km foot track under which a highway tunnel will be built, Saser Brangsa-Gapsam-Daulat Beg Oldi section in northwest is already motorable. SSSG-DBO Road connects to Darbuk–Shyok–DBO Road (DS-DBO Road) at two places: at Daulat Beg Oldi in northwest and also via the Saser La to Murgo (on DS-DBO Road) spur in northeast. Border Roads Organisation is constructing this road under the Project Himank. This strategically important road provides a much shorter alternative access from Nubra Valley to DBO as compared to the longer 230 km route via DS-DBO Road.

See also 
 India-China Border Roads
 Line of Actual Control
 Sino-Indian border dispute

References 

Roads in Ladakh
Transport in Leh